Azan Deh (also Romanized as Azān Deh) is a village in Rastupey Rural District, in the Central District of Savadkuh County, Mazandaran Province, Iran. At the 2006 census, its population was 115, in 36 families.

Pictures

References 

Populated places in Savadkuh County